Benita Ha (born January 19) is a Hong Kong Canadian actress. She is best known in Canada for her appearance in the television show Street Cents.

Life and career
Ha was once known for hosting the television show Street Cents, but her rapidly expanding list of credits on both the small screen and the big screen has allowed her to expand beyond the early days of her career. She studied journalism at the University of King's College in Halifax, Nova Scotia and communications at Simon Fraser University in Burnaby, British Columbia.

Ha has also appeared in Smallville, X-Men: The Last Stand, Psych, Paycheck, Catwoman, and Flight 93. She recently voiced the character Rebecca Chang in the survival horror video game Dead Rising 2 and appeared in Underworld: Awakening, R.L. Stine's The Haunting Hour, Innocent and Emily Owens M.D. and "Motive".

Ha was a publicist and consultant at MJM Communications. She also was a host, producer, field and segment producer, news anchor, and reporter at the CBC, CTV News Channel, Citytv, and Discovery Channel.

Ha was born in Hong Kong and can speak Cantonese. Her surname, Ha, means summer in Cantonese.

Ha once hosted the Vancouver Asian Canadian Theatre show - Chop Suey Special #10'' with Canadian comedian Tom Chin at the Norman Rothstein Theatre on January 23, 2010.

In 2011, Ha appeared in a Bank of Montreal commercial. In the commercial, she played the role of a banker. She also voiced the character Rebecca Chang again in the video game Dead Rising 2: Off the Record.

Ha was a practical nurse at George Pearson Centre and has been a practical nurse at St. Paul's Hospital since 2012. She continues to act.

Filmography

References

External links

Canadian film actresses
Canadian television actresses
Canadian voice actresses
Canadian people of Chinese descent
Living people
Year of birth missing (living people)
Place of birth missing (living people)